The Rust-Oleum Automotive Finishes 100 (formerly the Southern Illinois 100) is an ARCA Menards Series stock car race held annually on the DuQuoin State Fairgrounds Racetrack during the DuQuoin State Fair on Labor Day weekend.

Race history

The first 100-mile stock car race at the track was held in 1950. It has been a part of a national stock car circuit annually since 1954. AAA sanctioned the race until 1955, USAC from 1956 to 1984, and ARCA took over solely in 1985 after co-sanctioning the race in 1983 and 1984.

NASCAR Cup driver participation
In the 2000s, the race has seen participation from NASCAR Cup Series regulars Tony Stewart and Ken Schrader. Stewart won the race in 2003, and Schrader was victorious in 2006 and 2007.

Race winners

 References:

References

External links
 

ARCA Menards Series races
ARCA Menards Series
Motorsport in Illinois
Recurring sporting events established in 1950
1950 establishments in Illinois